Atelopus erythropus, the Carabaya stubfoot toad, is a species of toad in the family Bufonidae endemic to Peru. Its natural habitats are subtropical or tropical moist montane forests and rivers.

References

erythropus
Amphibians of Peru
Amphibians described in 1903
Taxonomy articles created by Polbot